Sacramento shooting or  Sacramento massacre may refer to:

Sacramento River massacre
1991 Sacramento hostage crisis
A shooting by Luis Bracamontes in 2014 that killed two police officers
Shooting of Stephon Clark in 2018
2022 Sacramento shooting